Sahaya is a 2019 Philippine television drama fantasy series broadcast by GMA Network. Directed by Zig Dulay, it stars Bianca Umali in the title role. It premiered on March 18, 2019 on the network's Telebabad line up replacing Onanay. The series concluded on September 6, 2019 with a total of 122 episodes. It was replaced by Beautiful Justice in its timeslot.

The series is streaming online on YouTube.

Premise
A disgraced Badjaw, Manisan Arati flees to Zamboanga upon learning her pregnancy to another man. She will later give birth to her daughter, Sahaya, who will develop a strong connection with the water, and will be torn between her childhood friend and a bachelor from Manila.

Cast and characters

Lead cast
 Bianca Umali as Sahaya Alari Mangayao

Supporting cast
 Miguel Tanfelix as Ahmad Kamaya
 Migo Adecer as Jordan Silverio Alvarez
 Mylene Dizon as Manisan Alari
 Eric Quizon as Hubert Alvarez
 Zoren Legaspi as Harold Mangayao
 Pen Medina as Panglima Alari Laut
 Ana Roces as Irene Alvarez vda. de Mangayao
 Ashley Ortega as Lyndsay Alvarez 
 Snooky Serna as Salida Saklang-Calliste

Guest cast
 Jasmine Curtis-Smith as young Manisan
 Benjamin Alves as Aratu Calliste
 Gil Cuerva as young Harold
 Karl Medina as young Panglima
 Angel Guardian as young Irene
 Kyle Kaizer as young Jordan
 Debra Liz as Babu Dalmina
 Juan Rodrigo as Bapa Armino
 Kim Belles as young Sahaya
 Yñigo Delen as young Ahmad
 Glaiza de Castro as Toni
 Dave Bornea as Inda
 Ayra Mariano as Hadiya
 Faith da Silva as Fareeda Buenavista
 Lovely Rivero as Dapantia "Pantia" Kamaya
 Prince Clemente as Errol
 Soliman Cruz as Umbo
 Rita Gaviola as Marriam
 Francesca Taruc as Omboh Putli
 Chanel Morales as Omboh Diona
 Lui Manansala as Susana de Guzman
 Mike Lloren as Dante
 Marinella Sevidal as Beyang
 Angelica Ulip as Althea
 Empress Schuck as Casilda
 Sue Prado as Lorie
 Marissa Delgado as Maureen Alvarez
 Gina Alajar as Almida Calliste
 BJ Forbes as Arlo
 John Feir as Djanggo
 Joel Saracho as Usman
 Zonia Mejia as Flerida
 Divine Tetay as Rain
 Kleif Almeda as Pia
 Pinky Amador as Estela Silverio-del Sol
 Yul Servo as Nolan del Sol
 Froilan Sales as Noel
 Kate Nicole Mendez as Kanduray Kamaya
 Kate Valdez as Kira
 Edgar Ebro as Omboh elder

Ratings
According to AGB Nielsen Philippines' Nationwide Urban Television Audience Measurement People in television homes, the final episode of Sahaya scored a 12.5% rating.

Accolades

References

External links
 
 

2019 Philippine television series debuts
2019 Philippine television series endings
Filipino-language television shows
GMA Network drama series
Television shows set in the Philippines